North Tazewell is a neighborhood of Tazewell, Virginia, United States. North Tazewell has its own post office with ZIP code 24630.  Cavitt's Creek Park at Lake Witten is located in North Tazewell.

Civilian Conservation Corps Camp was established in 1933, believed to be on land owned by the A.R. Beavers & Sons Dairy.

References

Geography of Tazewell County, Virginia
Former municipalities in Virginia
Neighborhoods in Virginia